Classic Diamonds – The DVD is a DVD video album by hard rock singer Doro Pesch, released in 2004 by AFM Records. The DVD contains footage from two concerts held during the European tour which followed the release of the studio album Classic Diamonds. The album was a special project for Doro Pesch, who revised and re-arranged some of her songs for the Classic Night Orchestra, a 30-elements symphonic orchestra. A smaller ensemble of the orchestra accompanied Doro and her usual touring musicians on tour, but the full orchestra was on stage in August 2004 at Wacken Open Air for a strictly acoustic set, an unusual performance for the largest European heavy metal festival.  Special guests of the night were former-Iron Maiden singer Blaze Bayley and guitarist Chris Caffery (Savatage, Trans-Siberian Orchestra).

As an extra, the DVD features also a concert held in Cologne, Germany, where Doro performed her usual heavy metal repertoire and which the German TV show Rockpalast broadcast on 17 October 2004.

Track listing
Intro
Live in Wacken - ≈ 43:00
"Fear of the Dark"
"I Rule the Ruins"
"Touch of Evil"
"Metal Tango"
"Für Immer"
"Let Love Rain on Me"
"Breaking the Law"
"All We Are"

Impressions of the tour - ≈ 15:00  
Documentary of the tour, backstage, interviews

Live In Hamburg - ≈ 61:00
"I Rule the Ruins"
"Metal Tango"
"She's Like Thunder"
"Let Love Rain on Me"
"Hellraiser" 
"Touch of Evil" 
"Fall for Me Again" 
"Tausend Mal Gelebt"
"Breaking the Law"
"Fear of the Dark" 
"All We Are" 
"Outro"

Extras - ≈ 63:00
"Let Love Rain on Me" - making of the do video clip
"Let Love Rain on Me" - video clip
Rockpalast TV Show 
"Metal Tango"
"True As Steel"
"Für Immer"
"Breaking the Law" 
"Interview"
"Let Love Rain on Me"
"Tausend Mal Gelebt" 
"All We Are"

Documentary of European Tour
Discography
Photo Gallery

Personnel

Band members
Doro Pesch - vocals
Nick Douglas - bass, keyboards, backing vocals
Joe Taylor - guitars, backing vocals
Johnny Dee - drums, percussion, backing vocals
Oliver Palotai - keyboards, guitars, backing vocals

Additional musicians
The Classic Night Orchestra
Blaze Bayley - lead vocals on "Fear of the Dark"
Chris Caffery - lead guitar on Wacken concert
Klaus Vanscheidt - guitars

Production
Frank Machel - director, editor
Ronald Matthes - director, executive producer
Matthias Mirke - executive producer
Patrick von Schuckmann - director, producer
Patrick Basedow, Erik Fugmann-Brandt, Alexandra Seifert - editors
Michael Hankel, Chris Lietz - mixing
Matthias Wendt - mastering

References

2004 video albums
Doro (musician) video albums
Live video albums
AFM Records video albums